Marco de Luigi (born 21 March 1978) is a retired Sammarinese footballer who last played for Cosmos.

References

1978 births
Living people
Sammarinese footballers
San Marino international footballers
Association football forwards
A.C. Juvenes/Dogana players
S.S. Murata players
S.P. Cailungo players
S.S. Virtus players
A.C. Libertas players
S.S. Cosmos players